Frank Robinson (August 31, 1935 – February 7, 2019) was an American professional baseball outfielder and manager in Major League Baseball (MLB) who played for five teams, from  to . He helped lead the Orioles to the first two World Series titles in franchise history in 1966 and 1970, and was named the Series MVP in 1966 after leading the Orioles to a four-game sweep of the Los Angeles Dodgers. In , Robinson became the first Black manager in big league history, as the Cleveland Indians’ player-manager.

A 14-time All-Star, Robinson batted .300 nine times, hit 30 home runs 11 times, and led his league in slugging four times and in runs scored three times. His 586 career home runs ranked fourth in major league history at the time of his retirement, and he ranked sixth in total bases (5,373) and extra-base hits (1,186), eighth in games played (2,808), and ninth in runs scored (1,829). His 2,943 career hits are the most since  by any player who fell short of the 3,000-hit mark. He was elected to the Baseball Hall of Fame in his first year of eligibility in 1982.

Robinson went on to manage the San Francisco Giants, Baltimore Orioles, and Montreal Expos/Washington Nationals. For most of the last two decades of his life, Robinson served in various executive positions for Major League Baseball concluding his career as honorary president of the American League.

Early life
Robinson was born in Beaumont, Texas. He was the youngest of Ruth Shaw's ten children and the only child of her marriage to Frank Robinson. His parents divorced when he was an infant, and his mother moved with her children to Alameda, California, and then to the West Oakland neighborhood of nearby Oakland. He attended McClymonds High School in Oakland where he was a basketball teammate of Bill Russell. He was a baseball teammate of Vada Pinson and Curt Flood. He also played American Legion Baseball.

Playing career

Minor leagues
In 1953, Bobby Mattick, a scout for the Cincinnati Reds, signed Robinson to a contract worth $3,500 ($ in current dollar terms). He made his professional debut for the Ogden Reds of the Class C Pioneer League. He batted .348 with 83 runs batted in (RBI) in 72 games played. He was promoted to the Tulsa Oilers of the Class AA Texas League in 1954, but was demoted to the Columbia Reds of the Class A South Atlantic League. He returned to Columbia in 1955.

Cincinnati Reds (1956–1965)
Robinson made his major league debut in 1956. In his rookie year with the Reds, Robinson tied the then-record of 38 home runs by a rookie and was named Rookie of the Year. The Reds won the NL pennant in 1961, and Robinson won his first MVP (in July he batted .409, hit 13 home runs, and drove in 34 runs to win NL Player of the Month), the last time the NL played a 154-game schedule. The Reds lost the 1961 World Series to the New York Yankees. In 1962, Robinson hit a career-high .342 with 39 home runs, 51 doubles, and 136 RBIs.

Robinson was noted as a fierce player. He spiked Johnny Logan in 1957, causing Logan to miss six weeks. He also got into a fistfight with Eddie Mathews in 1960.

Baltimore Orioles (1966–1971)
Prior to the 1966 season, Reds owner Bill DeWitt traded Robinson to the Baltimore Orioles in exchange for pitcher Milt Pappas, pitcher Jack Baldschun, and outfielder Dick Simpson. The trade turned out to be very lopsided. DeWitt, who had a slew of successful trades including his time as GM in Detroit and the early 1960s rebuilding the Reds, famously referred to Robinson as "not a young 30" after the trade. The Reds led the NL in offense in 1965 and needed pitching. Pappas, who was a consistent performer in Baltimore was a major disappointment in Cincinnati while Robinson had continued success in Baltimore. In Robinson's first year in Baltimore, he won the Triple Crown, leading the American League with a .316 batting average (the lowest ever by a Triple Crown winner), 49 home runs (the most ever by a right-handed Triple crown winner) and 122 runs batted in. On May 8, 1966, Robinson became the only player ever to hit a home run completely out of Memorial Stadium. The shot came off of Luis Tiant in the second game of a doubleheader against the Cleveland Indians, and the home run measured . Until the Orioles' move to Camden Yards in 1992, a flag labeled "HERE" was flown at the spot where the ball left the stadium.

The Orioles won the 1966 World Series, and Robinson was named World Series Most Valuable Player. In the Orioles' four-game sweep of the defending champion Los Angeles Dodgers, Robinson hit two home runs—one in Game One (which Baltimore won 5–2), and one in Game Four (the only run of the game in a 1–0 series-clinching victory). Robinson hit both home runs off of Don Drysdale.

During the 1969 season, Robinson brought some humor to the Orioles' clubhouse by presiding over their kangaroo court, held after every Oriole win. As the judge, he would hear arguments from both sides and give out fines for minor infractions (such as one dollar per lady talked to during a game) and "awards", named after people notoriously bad at a certain skill and involving a prop the "winner" had to display until the next court session. For instance, Jim Palmer once won the John Mason Baserunning Award, a smelly, decrepit baseball cleat presented for baserunning gaffes. Palmer credited the kangaroo court for helping the Orioles bond as a team.

On June 26, 1970, Robinson hit back-to-back grand slams in the fifth and sixth innings in the Orioles' 12–2 victory over the Washington Senators. The same runners were on base both times: Dave McNally was on third base, Don Buford was on second, and Paul Blair was on first.

The Orioles won three consecutive American League pennants between 1969 and 1971. Before the 1969 World Series, Robinson said, "Bring on the Mets and Ron Gaspar!" He was told by his teammate Merv Rettenmund, "It's Rod, stupid." He then retorted by saying, "OK. Bring on Rod Stupid!" Baltimore won the 1970 World Series over the Reds.

Final years as a player (1972–1976)
Robinson was traded along with Pete Richert from the Orioles to the Los Angeles Dodgers for Doyle Alexander, Bob O'Brien, Sergio Robles and Royle Stillman at the Winter Meetings on December 2, 1971. When the 1972 Major League Baseball strike occurred, Robinson was one of three Dodgers out of thirty who voted against it. When the vote was announced, he said, "I don't believe in the strike, and I voted against it. But I was voted down, so now I'm on your side. I'm with you guys." The 1972 season was his first season in the National League since playing with the 1965 Reds. He played 103 games while compiling a .251 batting average, 59 RBIs, 86 hits, and 19 home runs. Teammate Tommy John said, "Frank didn't have a great year in 1972, but he played hard all year...He set a positive role model for the team."

Robinson's only season with the Dodgers ended when he was dealt along with Bill Singer, Bobby Valentine, Billy Grabarkewitz and Mike Strahler to the California Angels for Andy Messersmith and Ken McMullen at the Winter Meetings on November 28, 1972. The transaction was the result of Robinson's request for regular playing time, something Dodgers general manager Al Campanis wanted for the team's younger prospects. It also reunited him with Angels general manager Harry Dalton who had worked in a similar capacity when both were with the Orioles. In his time with the Angels, he became their first designated hitter while also being teammates again with Vada Pinson. He played 147 games in 1973 and 129 in 1974. In his tenure with the Angels, he hit for a .259 average while having 50 home runs, 249 hits, and 160 RBIs.

On September 12, 1974, the Angels traded Robinson to the Cleveland Indians for Ken Suarez, cash and a player to be named later (Rusty Torres). Three weeks later the Indians named him their manager and persuaded him to continue playing. In his first at-bat as a player/manager for Cleveland in 1975, he hit a home run off of Doc Medich of the Yankees. He injured his shoulder in 1975 and did not play often. He retired from playing after the 1976 season, after batting .226 with 14 home runs in 235 at-bats for Cleveland from 1974 through 1976.

During a 21-year baseball career, he batted .294 with 586 home runs, 1,812 runs batted in, and 2,943 hits. At his retirement, his 586 career home runs were the fourth most in history (behind only the records of Hank Aaron, Babe Ruth and Willie Mays). He is second on Cincinnati's all-time home run leaders list (324, behind Johnny Bench) and is the Reds' all-time leader in slugging percentage (.554).

Manager

Managing career
Robinson managed in the winter leagues late in his playing career. By the early 1970s, he had his heart set on becoming the first black manager in the majors; the Angels traded him to the Cleveland Indians midway through the 1974 season due to his open campaigning for the manager's job. He was appointed player-manager by the Indians on October 2, 1974, giving him the distinction of being the first black manager in the Majors. Robinson had a rocky time in Cleveland, as general manager Phil Seghi generally liked to second guess his manager along with trying to push for him to play alongside managing (the result was that he played roughly 80 games as manager). Disagreements with players such as Gaylord Perry did not help matters (he went to the press saying he wanted to be paid a dollar more than Robinson's $173,500 salary). The Indians had a 79–80 record, and had an 81–78 record in 1976, their first winning record in eight years. Cleveland started the 1977 season 26–31 and fired Robinson on June 19, 1977.

Robinson managed the San Francisco Giants from 1981 through 106 games of the 1984 season, when he was fired. He finished the 1984 season as the hitting coach for the Milwaukee Brewers on a contract worth $1. In 1985, he joined the Orioles front office. He was named the manager of the Orioles for 1988. He was awarded the American League Manager of the Year Award in 1989 for leading the Orioles to an 87–75 record, a turnaround from their previous season in which they went 54–107, and the division title came down to the final three-game series between Baltimore and the Toronto Blue Jays, but the Jays would win the first two games to clinch the division. It would be the closest Robinson ever came to managing a team to the postseason.

Robinson managed the Orioles through 1991, and the Montreal Expos/Washington Nationals franchise from 2002 through 2006. After Robinson had spent some years known in baseball as the Director of Discipline, he was chosen by Major League Baseball in 2002 to manage the Expos, which MLB owned at that time. The Expos, who had losing records in the five previous seasons, finished the 2002 and 2003 seasons with 83–79 records. The Expos then next slumped to a 67–95 record in 2004, their final season before relocation to Washington, D.C.

In a June 2005 Sports Illustrated poll of 450 MLB players, Robinson was selected as the worst manager in baseball, along with Buck Showalter, then manager of the Texas Rangers. In the August 2006 poll, he again was voted worst manager with 17% of the vote and 37.7% of the NL East vote.

On April 20, 2006, with the Nationals' 10–4 victory over the Philadelphia Phillies, Robinson got his 1000th win, becoming the 53rd manager to reach that milestone. He had earned his 1000th loss two seasons earlier.

During a game against the Houston Astros on May 25, 2006, Robinson pulled Nationals catcher Matt LeCroy during the middle of the seventh inning, violating an unwritten rule that managers do not remove position players in the middle of an inning. Instead, managers are supposed to discreetly switch position players in between innings. However, LeCroy, the third-string catcher, had allowed Houston Astros baserunners to steal seven bases over seven innings and had committed two throwing errors. Although the Nationals won the game 8–5, Robinson found the decision so difficult to make on a player he respected so much, he broke down crying during post-game interviews.

On September 30, 2006, the Nationals' management declined to renew Robinson's contract for the 2007 season, though they stated he was welcome to come to spring training in an unspecified role. Robinson, who wanted either a front office job or a consultancy, declined. On October 1, 2006, he managed his final game, a 6–2 loss to the Mets, and prior to the game addressed the fans at RFK Stadium. Robinson's record as a manager stood at 1,065 wins and 1,176 losses. He is one of just seven managers to have won 1,000 games without having made the postseason once, and he is the only one to do it since the Expansion Era began in 1961 (incidentally, five of those managers won pennants in the 19th century, while the sixth was Jimmy Dykes who retired as a manager in 1961).

Managerial record

Honors

In addition to his two Most Valuable Player awards (1961 and 1966) and his World Series Most Valuable Player award (1966), Robinson was honored in 1966 with the Hickok Belt as the top professional athlete of the year in any sport.

In 1982, Robinson was inducted into the National Baseball Hall of Fame as a Baltimore Oriole. Robinson is also a charter member of the Baltimore Orioles Hall of Fame (along with Brooks Robinson), and a member of the Cincinnati Reds Hall of Fame, being inducted into both in 1978. He was named to the Washington Nationals Ring of Honor for his "significant contribution to the game of baseball in Washington, D.C" on May 9, 2015. He was inducted into the Cleveland Indians Hall of Fame in 2016. The Reds, Orioles, and Indians have retired his uniform number 20. He is one of only two major-league players, the other being Nolan Ryan, to have his number retired by three different organizations.

In 1999, Robinson ranked 22nd on The Sporting News list of the 100 Greatest Baseball Players. He was nominated as a finalist for the Major League Baseball All-Century Team.

Three teams have honored Robinson with statues: 
In 2003, the Reds dedicated a bronze statue of Robinson at Great American Ball Park.
In 2012, the Orioles unveiled a bronze statue of Robinson at Oriole Park at Camden Yards as part of the Orioles Legends Celebration Series. 
In 2017, the Indians unveiled a bronze statue of Robinson in front of Progressive Field.

Awards

President George W. Bush awarded Robinson the Presidential Medal of Freedom on November 9, 2005.

The citation on the award read:

On April 13, 2007, Robinson was awarded the first Jackie Robinson Society Community Recognition Award at George Washington University.

Records
In his career, Robinson held several major league records. In his rookie season, he tied Wally Berger's record for home runs by a rookie (38). (The current record would be set by Pete Alonso in 2019.)

Robinson still holds the record for home runs on opening day (8), which includes a home run in his first at bat as a player-manager.

Robinson won the American League Triple Crown (.316 BA, 49 HR, 122 RBI). Only two players (Carl Yastrzemski and Miguel Cabrera) have since won the award in either league and the two MVP awards, which made him the first player in baseball history to earn the title in both leagues.

Front office and media career

Robinson served as an assistant general manager for the Orioles through 1995 when he was fired. He worked for MLB as vice president of on-field operations from 1999 to 2002. He was responsible for player discipline, uniform policy, stadium configuration, and other on-field issues.

Robinson served as an analyst for ESPN during spring training in 2007. The Nationals offered to honor Robinson during a May 20 game against his former club the Baltimore Orioles but he refused.

In 2007 Robinson rejoined the MLB front office serving as a special advisor for baseball operations from 2007 to 2009. He then served as special assistant to Bud Selig from 2009 to 2010 and was named senior vice president for major league operations from 2010 to 2011. In June 2012, he became executive vice president of baseball development. In February 2015, Robinson left his position as executive vice president of baseball development and was named senior advisor to the Commissioner of Baseball and honorary American League president.

Personal life
While playing for the Reds in the late 1950s, Robinson attended Xavier University in Cincinnati during the off-season. While in Baltimore, he became active in the civil rights movement. He originally declined membership in the NAACP unless the organization promised not to make him do public appearances. However, after witnessing Baltimore's segregated housing and discriminatory real estate practices, he reconsidered and became an enthusiastic speaker on racial issues.

On February 9, 1961, Robinson pulled a .25 caliber pistol during an argument in a Cincinnati restaurant. He pleaded guilty on March 20 to a charge of carrying a concealed weapon and was sentenced to pay a $250 fine.

Robinson met his wife, Barbara Ann Cole, in 1961. They married that year and lived in Los Angeles where Barbara sold real estate. They had two children. In 2003, he guest starred on an episode of Yes, Dear as himself, along with Ernie Banks and Johnny Bench.

On February 7, 2019, Robinson died of bone cancer in Los Angeles at the age of 83.

See also

 500 home run club
 List of Major League Baseball players to hit for the cycle
 List of Major League Baseball annual doubles leaders
 List of Major League Baseball annual home run leaders
 List of Major League Baseball annual runs batted in leaders
 List of Major League Baseball annual runs scored leaders
 List of Major League Baseball batting champions
 List of Major League Baseball career doubles leaders
 List of Major League Baseball career hits leaders
 List of Major League Baseball career home run leaders
 List of Major League Baseball career runs scored leaders
 List of Major League Baseball career stolen bases leaders
 List of Major League Baseball home run records
 List of Major League Baseball managers by wins
 List of Major League Baseball player-managers
 List of Major League Baseball single-game grand slam leaders
 Major League Baseball Triple Crown

Bibliography

References

Further reading
Frank Robinson archive at The Baltimore Sun (May 7, 2013)

External links

Frank Robinson at  SABR (Baseball BioProject)
Frank Robinson at  Baseball Almanac
Frank Robinson at Baseballbiography.com

 
 

 
 

 
 

1935 births
2019 deaths
African-American baseball coaches
African-American baseball managers
African-American baseball players
American League All-Stars
American League batting champions
American League home run champions
American League Most Valuable Player Award winners
American League RBI champions
American League Triple Crown winners
Baltimore Orioles coaches
Baltimore Orioles executives
Baltimore Orioles managers
Baltimore Orioles players
Baseball players from Texas
Baseball players from Oakland, California
California Angels coaches
California Angels players
Caribbean Series managers
Cincinnati Redlegs players
Cincinnati Reds players
Cleveland Indians managers
Cleveland Indians players
Columbia Reds players
Deaths from bone cancer
Deaths from cancer in California
Gold Glove Award winners
Los Angeles Dodgers players
Major League Baseball All-Star Game MVPs
Major League Baseball bench coaches
Major League Baseball broadcasters
Major League Baseball executives
Major League Baseball first base coaches
Major League Baseball hitting coaches
Major League Baseball managers with retired numbers
Major League Baseball player-managers
Major League Baseball players with retired numbers
Major League Baseball right fielders
Major League Baseball Rookie of the Year Award winners
Manager of the Year Award winners
Milwaukee Brewers coaches
Minor league baseball managers
Montreal Expos managers
National Baseball Hall of Fame inductees
National League All-Stars
National League Most Valuable Player Award winners
Ogden Reds players
Presidential Medal of Freedom recipients
Rochester Red Wings managers
San Francisco Giants managers
Sportspeople from Beaumont, Texas
Tulsa Oilers (baseball) players
Washington Nationals managers
World Series Most Valuable Player Award winners
Xavier University alumni
20th-century African-American sportspeople
21st-century African-American people